Kessel Plays Standards (subtitled Barney Kessel Volume 2) is an album by guitarist Barney Kessel released on the Contemporary label and featuring eight tracks originally released on the Barney Kessel Volume 2 10-inch album which were recorded at sessions in 1954 along with an additional four tracks from 1955.

Kessel wrote in the liner notes that it was his purpose "in this album to use an instrumentation that hadn't been recorded before, or at least rarely recorded, and to capture some different sounds, combinations of different instruments."

The cover photograph was taken by California jazz and fashion photographer William Claxton.

Reception

The Allmusic review by Scott Yanow states: "Inventive frameworks and the utilization of Cooper's jazz oboe (a real rarity in jazz of the time) give the otherwise boppish reissue its own personality".

Track listing
 "Speak Low" (Kurt Weill, Ogden Nash) - 2:45
 "Love Is Here to Stay" (George Gershwin, Ira Gershwin) - 3:26
 "On a Slow Boat to China" (Frank Loesser) - 3:18
 "How Long Has This Been Going On?" (George Gershwin, Ira Gershwin) - 3:20
 "My Old Flame" (Arthur Johnston, Sam Coslow) - 3:39
 "Jeepers Creepers" (Harry Warren, Johnny Mercer) - 3:51
 "Barney's Blues" (Barney Kessel) - 3:00
 "Prelude to a Kiss" (Duke Ellington, Irving Gordon, Irving Mills) - 3:13
 "A Foggy Day" (George Gershwin, Ira Gershwin) - 3:10
 "You Stepped Out of a Dream" (Nacio Herb Brown, Gus Kahn) - 2:53
 "I Didn't Know What Time It Was" (Richard Rodgers, Lorenz Hart) - 3:57
 "64 Bars on Wilshire" (Kessel) - 3:17  
Recorded at Contemporary's studio in Los Angeles on June 4, 1954 (tracks 1, 3, 8 & 9), July 1, 1954 (tracks 2, 4, 7 & 12) and September 12, 1955 (tracks 5, 6, 10 & 11).

Personnel
Barney Kessel - guitar
Bob Cooper - tenor saxophone, oboe
Claude Williamson (tracks 1-4, 7-9 & 12), Hampton Hawes (tracks 6, 10 & 11) - piano
Monty Budwig (tracks 1-4, 7-9 & 12), Red Mitchell (tracks 5, 6, 10 & 11) - bass
Shelly Manne (tracks 1-4, 7-9 & 12), Chuck Thompson (tracks 5, 6, 10 & 11) - drums

References

Contemporary Records albums
Barney Kessel albums
1956 albums